The 1932–33 season was Port Vale's 27th season of football in the English Football League, and their third successive season (26th overall) in the Second Division. The season is notable as the last season of football for legendary striker Wilf Kirkham – who finished as top scorer for the sixth time in his Vale career. It is also notable for a 9–1 thrashing of Chesterfield in which Stewart Littlewood scored six goals – both feats are still standing club records. Otherwise an unremarkable season, the club limped to 17th in the league and exited the FA Cup at the Third Round, whilst rivals Stoke City were promoted as champions.

Overview

Second Division
The pre-season worries over the Great Depression saw ticket prices reduced, as The Old Recreation Ground's capacity was increased, and a radio-gramophone broadcaster with four loudspeakers was installed. New signings included Bradford Park Avenue outside-left Bob Morton and Cardiff City left-half Jimmy McGrath.

The season began well, an opening day victory over Bury was followed by a useful sequence of results that saw the club climb the table. Their 9–1 win over Chesterfield on 24 September was the biggest victory of the season in the division, and a still standing club record victory in the Football League. Stewart Littlewood scored an incredible six goals that day – also a still standing club record, all within a 57 minute period. The Vale followed this record win with a 7–0 defeat at Bradford City's Valley Parade, in what had been dubbed a promotion clash. Shenton twisted his knee in the latter match, and the list of injuries began to mount, Littlewood also requiring an operation to repair cartilage damage. This prompted the signing of Manchester United's highly experienced ex-England international forward Louis Page, brother of ex-Vale player Tom Page.

From 15 October to 3 December Vale were on a run of eight games without a win, six of them defeats. One of these defeats was a 5–0 hammering at Notts County's Meadow Lane, and another was a 1–0 defeat at Stoke City's Victoria Ground in front of 29,296 spectators, yet another was a 4–0 loss at Tottenham Hotspur's White Hart Lane in front of a crowd of 33,071. In December a shake-up in the first eleven brought four successive home victories, though only one point was won from three away games. Stoke defender Len Armitage was brought in to help sure up the defence as the club hovered in mid-table.

In January, ten year veteran left-back Jimmy Oakes was sold to Charlton Athletic for £3,000. On 4 March, Stoke romped home to a 3–1 derby win, with a certain Stanley Matthews scoring his first goal for the "Potters". After this the "Valiants" went five games unbeaten, which started with them picking up a point at Old Trafford. They won three and lost four of their seven April games. The 26 April game against Charlton Athletic at The Valley was remarkable as Oakes became the first ever player to play for opposite teams in the same match – this happened as before his transfer he had played for Vale in a game with the "Addicks" that was called off before full-time due to fog. The final game of the season was a 6–1 beating at Blundell Park by Grimsby Town, though by this time their survival in the division was already ensured.

They finished in seventeenth position with 38 points, four points clear of relegated Chesterfield, and seventeen points short of promoted Spurs. Meanwhile the reserve side won the Cheshire League for the fifth successive season.

Finances
On the financial side, a profit of £481 was made due to strict economic management. Wages were reduced and the "A" team was scrapped. Gate receipts had again fallen, now standing at £11,447. Another clear-out of players took place: with Billy Easton, Louis Page, Stewart Littlewood, Tom Tippett, Wilf Kirkham, Jock Leckie, and Ben Davies all leaving on free transfers. Easton joined Aldershot, Page signed with Yeovil & Petters United, Littlewood went to Bournemouth & Boscombe Athletic, Tippett joined West Ham United, Leckie went to Stockport County. Kirkham retired as a professional to concentrate on his duties as an educator, turning out as an amateur for Kidderminster Harriers in the Birmingham League.

Cup competitions
In the FA Cup, Vale lost 2–1 at First Division relegation strugglers Blackpool's Bloomfield Road in the Third Round.

League table

Results
Port Vale's score comes first

Football League Second Division

Results by matchday

Matches

FA Cup

Player statistics

Appearances

Top scorers

Transfers

Transfers in

Transfers out

References
Specific

General

Port Vale F.C. seasons
Port Vale